Parava (also Romanized as Pāravā; also known as Yarū) is a village in Howmeh Rural District, in the Central District of Bandar Lengeh County, Hormozgan Province, Iran. At the 2006 census, its population was 17, in 4 families.

References 

Populated places in Bandar Lengeh County